Tseki is a town in Thabo Mofutsanyane District Municipality in the Free State province of South Africa. It is one of the oldest kasis in Qwaqwa (Phuthaditjhaba). Together with Thaba Bosiu, Bolata, Makwane, Puelong and Thaba Ntsho they were the first places where people settled when Qwaqwa was first formed by the apartheid government.

References

Populated places in the Maluti a Phofung Local Municipality